Bongwe (Ebongwe, Ghebongwe) is a minor Bantu language of Gabon.

References

Tsogo languages